Strathmore, or Strathmore "By the Park" Subdivision, is a neighborhood in the southwest of Syracuse, New York, United States. It is a mostly residential neighborhood that has many houses from the early and middle of the twentieth century.

The subdivision was planned by 1917 and developed in 1919 by Clark & Porter, Inc.  Marketing materials stated "...no smoke, no dirt, no fogs, no two-family or apartment houses, no business places of any kind, nothing but homes." An extension of the middle class and upper middle class Summit Avenue residential neighborhood on the other side of Onondaga Park and Hiawatha Lake, Strathmore was marketed as "an exclusive residential district" when it officially opened on September 27, 1919. It attracted solidly middle class and upper middle class residents into various enclaves such as Robineau Road. The original advertisement flyer proclaimed "There can be no cheap homes in Strathmore by the Park", referring to Onondaga Park. Strathmore was zoned strictly residential, allowing for only single-family homes with a garage. It also contains many rental properties in the "less greater" section past Summit Ave.

Today, the neighborhood remains desirable and attracts a diverse, solidly middle and upper middle class population of white collar, academic, and creative class professionals. Strathmore is characterized by its Garden City town planning principles, bucolic tree-lined streets, and residential architecture of well-built Colonial Revival, Georgian, Federal, Norman French, Tudor, and Arts and Crafts style homes.  During the annual Strathmore House Tour, five renovated houses are open to the public. In 1987, Onondaga Park became an official Syracuse Historic Preservation District.

It was added to the National Register of Historic Places in 2006. Strathmore homes designed by Ward Wellington Ward which are listed on the National Register of Historic Places are:
Clark House, 105 Strathmore Drive
Dunfee House, 206 Summit Avenue
Fairchild House, 111 Clairmont Ave
Hunziker House, 265 Robineau Road
Porter House, 106 Strathmore Drive
Sanford House, 211 Summit Ave 
Stowell House, 225 Robineau Road
White House, 176 Robineau Road

Other listings on the National Register of Historic Places are the Huntley Apartments, Onondaga Highlands-Swaneola Heights Historic District, Onondaga Park, and Strathmore "By the Park" Subdivision.

References

External links

  Official Site of the Greater Strathmore Neighborood Association

Neighborhoods in Syracuse, New York
Colonial Revival architecture in New York (state)
Historic districts in Onondaga County, New York
Historic districts on the National Register of Historic Places in New York (state)
National Register of Historic Places in Syracuse, New York